Established in 1977, Atlantic Legal Foundation is a nonprofit, nonpartisan public interest law firm with a history of advocating for individual liberty, free enterprise, property rights, limited and efficient government, sound science in the courtroom, and school choice.  Atlantic Legal provides legal representation, without fee, to individuals, corporations, trade associations, parents, scientists and educators. The Foundation frequently files amicus curiae briefs in high-profile court cases before state supreme courts, federal circuit courts, and the United States Supreme Court.

Atlantic Legal is overseen by a board of directors composed of corporate executives, partners of major law firms, and current and retired corporate chief legal officers. The Board reviews and decides the cases in which Atlantic Legal will participate. The Foundation also has an Advisory Council, which consists of attorneys, scientists, medical doctors, and educators.

Programs

Constitutional issues

Atlantic Legal has participated in cases involving a broad range of state and federal constitutional law issues. The Foundation has filed briefs in cases concerning free speech, equal protection, due process, federalism, separation of powers, property rights, and international law. Atlantic Legal filed amicus briefs in such high-profile cases in U.S. Supreme Court as Grutter v. Bollinger and Gratz v. Bollinger (whether affirmative action policies at the University of Michigan were constitutional), Rumsfeld v. FAIR (whether military recruiters could access college campuses), Rapanos v. United States (whether the United States possessed the authority to regulate the dredging of wetlands under the Clean Water Act), Crawford v. Marion County Election Board (whether Indiana voter ID law was constitutional) and Wal-Mart v. Dukes (involving class certification for class action lawsuits). In Crosby v. National Foreign Trade Council, a Supreme Court case involving a state law barring state agencies from doing business with Myanmar (formerly Burma), Atlantic Legal submitted a brief on behalf of former President Gerald R. Ford  as well as a group of former Secretaries of State, Defense, Treasury, and Commerce, former National Security Advisors, former presidential chiefs of staff, and senior members of Congress.

The Foundation has recently filed briefs in the Supreme Court of the United States on issues ranging from challenging the constitutionality of the President's purported recess appointments to the National Labor Relations Board in the Noel Canning case, to challenging the attempt by plaintiffs in DaimlerChrysler v. Bauman to bring before U.S. courts a matter involving a foreign corporation and foreign nationals, and actions that allegedly took place in a foreign jurisdiction, having no impact on the United States or its citizens.

Congress's treaty power was before the Court in Bond v. United States, where Atlantic Legal argued that the fundamental structure of the Constitution defines and limits the powers of the government which cannot be expanded by the executive or legislative branches.  In Mariner's Cove Homeowners' Association v. U.S. Army Corps of Engineers, the Foundation urged the Court to grant certiorari in a "takings" case when the government refused compensation for the loss of periodic assessments owed to a homeowners' association by property owners whose parcels were taken by the federal government for a flood control project.  In Harris v. Quinn, Atlantic Legal supported the plaintiffs' contention that a collective bargaining agreement that required Medicaid home-care personal assistants to pay a fee for unwanted union representation violates the First Amendment.  In Chamber of Commerce v. EPA, Atlantic Legal urged the Court to overturn the EPA's "greenhouse gas" regulations as violative of procedural due process.

Sound science

Atlantic Legal's sound science program advocates for the admissibility of sound medical and expert testimony in toxic tort, product liability and other types of litigation. Atlantic Legal challenges the admissibility of "junk science" in the courtroom and has been recognized as "leading the way in focusing courts' attention on the need for rigorous scrutiny of scientific and other expert testimony." The Foundation has authored amicus briefs on behalf of distinguished scientists and scholars, including two dozen Nobel Laureates. By exposing questionable scientific methods, the Foundation has "successfully challenged bogus theories of medical causation" in toxic tort cases involving asbestos and other hazardous substances.

In Daubert v. Merrell Dow Pharmaceuticals, a landmark Supreme Court decision that set the evidentiary standards for expert witness testimony, the Court's majority opinion specifically cited the Foundation's amicus curiae brief as part of its analysis. Other important Supreme Court cases where Atlantic Legal's legal briefs have affected the outcome include Joiner v. General Electric and Kumho Tire Co. v. Carmichael (in which the Foundation's amicus brief was also cited), which, in conjunction with Daubert, comprise the so-called "Daubert trilogy" of cases that lay out the Daubert standard for expert witness testimony in federal courts. In all three cases Atlantic Legal "convinced the high court that the judiciary should use high standards in determining which scientific evidence is admissible" and "succeed[ed] in having plaintiff’s scientific experts deemed unsuitable".

Much of the Foundation's recent efforts in the sound science arena have involved challenging the theory that exposure to a single fiber of asbestos can be a "substantial cause" of mesothelioma, efforts that have been rewarded with favorable decisions in several state courts.

Corporate governance

The Foundation's corporate governance program was established to advocate against intrusive regulation of business and to foster corporate governance. Atlantic Legal believes that "corporate accountability is best secured by the personal choices of customers and investors, not by ineffective regulators or activist courts."

Atlantic Legal has challenged class action lawsuits against corporations where abuse of procedure may have occurred. Such cases include Ruben v. Honeywell International and Wal-Mart v. Dukes, where Atlantic Legal filed briefs in support of Honeywell and Wal-Mart to ensure that the courts used proper procedure, including respecting due process rights, in determining the cases.

The Foundation was an early proponent of preservation of the attorney-client privilege against compulsory waiver of that essential protection where corporate misconduct has been alleged.

School choice

Atlantic Legal fights to ensure that parents have choices about where to send their children for schooling. The Foundation's work in this area is focused on supporting charter schools, including launching a website dedicated to defending charter schools from those seeking to stymie their growth. A major part of this effort is publishing a series of state-specific law guides titled "Leveling the Playing Field", which educate charter school leaders about how to combat organizing campaigns of labor unions in their respective jurisdictions.

The Foundation has also evaluated and proposed reforms to New York's charter renewal procedures and has counseled many charter schools that have faced challenges from those reluctant to change the education status quo.

Position papers

Atlantic Legal regularly publishes papers considering legal issues of public concern: for example, inadequate judicial compensation and its impact on the New York economy, the need for a restructuring of New York's court system and correcting weaknesses in law school curricula.

Funding

The Atlantic Legal Foundation is a non-profit 501(c)(3) foundation that relies on grants from corporations, private foundations, law firms, and individuals.

References

External links
 
 Organizational Profile – National Center for Charitable Statistics (Urban Institute)

Non-profit organizations based in New York (state)
501(c)(3) organizations